The following lists events that happened during 1982 in the Grand Duchy of Luxembourg.

Incumbents

Events

January – March
 1 January – Lydie Polfer becomes the new Mayor of Luxembourg City.
 22 February – Belgium unilaterally devalues the Belgian franc by 8.5%, without consulting Luxembourg, whose franc is pegged to it.  Luxembourg is forced to follow unwillingly.
 27 March – 40,000 people protest in the streets at the government's response to the crisis in the steel industry.

April – June
 8 April – A law is passed to restrict the indexing of wage settlements in an attempt to stem inflation, which peaks at 9.4% over 1982.
 24 April – Representing Luxembourg, Svetlana finishes sixth in the Eurovision Song Contest 1982 with the song Cours après le temps.
 13 June – France's Bernard Hinault wins the 1982 Tour de Luxembourg.
 13 July – A law is passed to give government subsidies to aid foreign direct investment in Luxembourg.

July – September
 29 September – An Aeroflot flight crashes whilst landing at Luxembourg-Findel, killing six.

October – December
 3 December – Camille Ney resigns from the government due to poor health.
 21 December – Ernest Mühlen is appointed in Camille Ney's place as minister, whilst Jean-Claude Juncker is promoted to secretary of state.

Deaths
 14 November – Lucien Bidinger, cyclist

Footnotes

References